Euriphene amicia, the friendly nymph, is a butterfly in the family Nymphalidae. It is found in Sierra Leone, Liberia, Ivory Coast, Ghana, Togo, Nigeria, Cameroon, the Republic of the Congo and the Democratic Republic of the Congo. The habitat consists of forests.

The larvae feed on Napoleonaea vogelii. They are gregarious.

Subspecies
Euriphene amicia amicia (eastern Ivory Coast, Ghana, Nigeria, Cameroon, Congo, Democratic Republic of the Congo)
Euriphene amicia gola Fox, 1965 (Sierra Leone, Liberia, western Ivory Coast)

References

Butterflies described in 1871
Euriphene
Butterflies of Africa
Taxa named by William Chapman Hewitson